Return to Del is the eighth and final book of the original series of Deltora Quest written by Emily Rodda. It focuses on how Lief, Jasmine, and Barda must return to Del to give the completed Belt to Adin's heir to banish the Shadow Lord from their land.

Plot summary
The main characters of the book are Barda, Lief and Jasmine, who have retrieved all seven of the magic gems from their perilous Guardians and lairs. They now have the topaz, ruby, emerald, lapis lazuli, diamond, opal and amethyst gems. The Belt is whole and made, but the hardest part of the journey is yet to come—they need to find the heir of Adin, the true heir to Deltora's throne. There is, however, another problem. Lief's father tells him that they would find the heir with the Belt, for it will show the way, but the Belt shows them the way but shows no sign of recognition of the heir. 

The party knows there is a problem and they have to do something about it. They also know that they need to recruit a member of each of the seven tribes as well. The seven tribe members are Lief of Del for the topaz, Manus of the Ralad people for the ruby, Steven (and Nevets) of the Plains people for the opal, Fardeep of the Mere for the lapis lazuli, Gla-Thon of the Dread Gnomes for the emerald, Zeean of Tora for the amethyst, and Glock of the Jalis for the diamond.

In addition to this, they now need to awaken the Belt's hidden powers and find the heir to the throne of Deltora. However, along the way, their friend Steven and his brother Nevets tell the three to go across a field of hidden grippers, which are plants composed of deep holes with venomous teeth inside to avoid the Grey Guards positioned in the road searching all the caravans passing by. Lief and Jasmine escaped relatively unharmed, but Barda suffers severe damage. They are forced into a small cabin when they find the remains of a man, woman, and small child bearing a note from King Endon with the royal seal at the bottom. 

When the gang finally reaches the Resistance stronghold, Barda wakes up long enough to tell the three that the letter was false and planted there by the Shadow Lord because when Endon escaped with Sharn, he did not have the royal seal with him as it had always been held with Prandine. Barda's condition worsens, until he has almost died when all seven tribes are reunited. Lief realizes that Dain is the heir as the Belt is showing that the heir is somewhere in the room. To help prove this, Lief realized that Dain's name is an anagram of 'Adin'. Dain is then kidnapped by Ichabod just when Lief was supposed to hand over the Belt, and the Belt falls on Barda who then starts to make a recovery. 

Everyone heads to Del to rescue Dain and falls into an elaborated trap where the puppet master is revealed at last - no other than Dain himself. Dain is a Grade 3 Ol and he has been fooling them all along. Lief manages to kill him with the Belt and then Lief, Jasmine, Barda, and Doom escape to Lief's old home, where the second secret is revealed - Doom is actually Jasmine's father.

Everyone is then arrested by Grey Guards except for Lief who then, with Kree, goes to the punishment place in the palace to try and save them. When he is there, he suddenly remembers a passage from a book that his father showed him: "Only the Belt of Deltora, complete as it was first fashioned by Adin and worn by Adin's true heir, has the power to defeat the Enemy." He rearranges the gems in the socketed Belt so that their initials spell Deltora (the order would be Diamond, Emerald, Lapis Lazuli, Topaz, Opal, Ruby, and finally Amethyst), and the Belt's powers flare to life, saving the country. Lief realizes then that he is the heir and the very last secret is shown, that Endon and Jarred switched places because no one could suspect that a king and queen of Deltora could work as a simple blacksmith and wife. Endon, Lief's father, dies a peaceful death now that Deltora has been rid of the Shadow Lord at last.

Characters
Lief: Lief is the main character of the series. Lief was born to parents King Endon and Queen Sharn though he believed them to be Jarred and Anna of the forge. As a child Lief roamed the streets of Del, sharpening his wits and gaining him the skills needed for his future quests. Though he did not know it, he was constantly protected by Barda and he prided himself on his many 'lucky' escapes. On his sixteenth birthday it is revealed to him that he must begin a dangerous quest to find the lost gems of the Belt of Deltora.
Barda: Barda was enlisted as a friend by the king and queen of Deltora and was trusted to help him find the lost gems of Deltora sixteen years before the initial story took place. For the next sixteen years Barda disguised himself as a beggar so as to discover information vital to the quest. He also became the bodyguard of Endon and Sharn's child Lief, albeit without the semi-arrogant Lief's knowledge thereof. Upon Lief's sixteenth birthday Barda revealed himself to Lief and the quest for the gems of Deltora began. Though Barda was at first annoyed to travel encumbered by a child, he soon saw Lief as more of a help than a hindrance. Leif is found to be the true heir to the throne.
Jasmine: Jasmine is a wild girl, described as having wild black hair (dark green hair in the anime) and emerald green eyes who has grown up in the Forests of Silence, where Lief and Barda meet her shortly after leaving Del. Her parents, were captured by Grey Guards when she was seven years old, and so she has been raised by the forest. She can understand the language of the trees and of many animals, and has incredibly sharp senses, but has trouble understanding some social customs. Jasmine is usually seen with her raven, Kree, and a mouse-like creature she calls Filli. Jasmine is like Lief and occasionally has a quick temper. After helping Lief and Barda in the forest and with the help of the topaz, she is greeted by her mother's spirit from beyond the grave, who tells her to go with Lief and Barda in their quest. After this encounter, she joins Lief and Barda in the search for the great gems that will complete the Belt.
Kree: Kree is a raven and one of Jasmine's closest companions in the Forest of Silence. His family was taken and eaten by the witch Thaegan, and Kree was found by Jasmine. She took pity on him, as both had their family taken away, and she took care of Kree. Kree treats Jasmine as his master, and does not tolerate offensive behavior towards Jasmine. His presence is advantageous towards the three companions, as he is able to fly ahead and warn the others of oncoming danger or safety.
Filli: Filli is a small, mouse-like creature (although Jasmine denies that he resembles any rodent) called a Siskis. He was rescued by Jasmine when she discovered him paralyzed by the Wenn in The Forests of Silence. As such, he remains close to Jasmine and Kree, often hiding himself in Jasmine's clothing when danger arises. Like Kree, Jasmine is able to understand Filli. His small size is often advantageous to Lief, Barda and Jasmine, as he is able to hide easily and eavesdrop on others.
Manus: Manus is a Ralad from the city of Raladin. He cannot speak, due to a curse placed upon the Ralad people by the witch Thaegan when their ancestors spoke out against her evil. His voice, though, was soon well again. As a Ralad, Manus is an exceptional musician and architect, as well as bearing the traditional Ralad blue skin, red hair, and black button eyes. He returns in Return to Del to represent his tribe.
Steven/Nevets: Steven is a peddler whom Lief, Barda, and Jasmine encounter on their journey. He is cheerful and pleasant, and constantly singing. His mother is Queen Bee herself, and he supplies Queen Bee products to the Resistance. Lief at first worries about Steven travelling alone in such dangerous times, but he is told that Steven is safe without companions, as he is accompanied by his brother, Nevets. The two grew up on the plain in the territory of the opal. Nevets is 'Steven' spelled backwards. He is a great, golden giant living within Steven, and appears whenever Steven, or someone close to him, is threatened, and does not distinguish between friend or foe. Steven often has great trouble controlling his brother, though he lets him free on several occasions. Steven acts as a representative of the Plains tribe in the ceremony to find the heir of Deltora.
Fardeep: Fardeep is from the Mere tribe and used to own the Champion Inn until the Shadow Lord took it over. The Shadow Lord's minions attacked Rithmere and Fardeep was forced out of his life of luxury. He came to what is now the Valley of the Lost to find peace but the Shadow Lord's influence seeped into his mind, promising him riches and luxury again and Fardeep fell into despair and temptation conquered him and thus he became the Guardian of the diamond. His role in Return to Del was important that he is a pure-blood Meres man and therefore a descendant of the original Deltorans. He represented the Mere tribe.
Gla-Thon: Gla-Thon belongs to the Dread Gnomes tribe, and as such, is a proud and honorable archer. She meets Lief, Barda and Jasmine when they are captured by the Dread Gnomes, and agrees to assist them in destroying the evil toad that lords over the Gnomes. As such, the Gnomes are freed from their slavery and owe a great debt to Lief. Gla-Thon represents the Dread Gnomes in the ceremony to find the heir of Deltora.
Zeean: Zeean is a wise, old Toran leader who assists Lief on several occasions in repayment for releasing her tribe from The Valley of the Lost, and holds significant standing in the Toran community. She represents the Torans in the ceremony to find the lost heir of Deltora.
Glock: Glock is a savage member of the Jalis tribe, and one of the last remaining Jalis people. He was knocked unconscious during the great battle between the Jalis tribe and the servants of the Shadow Lord shortly after the Shadow Lord's invasion. He came across Lief, Barda and Jasmine at the Rithmere Games, where he became one of the semi-finalists. He mocked Jasmine's petite size, but before he could fight her, he was secretly drugged by Doom. Upon regaining consciousness, Glock was captured, along with Neridah, by Grey Guards and were taken to the Shadowlands; before they arrived, however, they were rescued by Doom, and both decided to join the Resistance. Glock caused great trouble at the Resistance, and was eventually moved to Withick Mire, where he took part as a Jalis representative in the ceremony to find the heir of Deltora.
Dain: Dain was originally a nervous servant to Doom and a member of the Resistance. He was cultured, polite, respectful, and often afraid, yet noble in battle and showing evidence of a great spirit. He saved Lief, Barda, and Jasmine from the Ols, before they knew what an Ol was, and helped them escape from Doom, when Doom held them prisoner for his own reasons. However, Dain was kidnapped by pirates. When the trio later encountered the same pirates, Dain had just freed himself with the help of a polypan, and he came with them to Tora, the magical city. Dain had hoped to meet his parents in Tora, but the city was deserted. He seemed to be all but destroyed by the news, but once they left the city he seemed to feel more hopeful. In the final book, Lief assembles representatives of all seven tribes to pledge loyalty to the heir and thus hope that the Belt will lead them to the heir. It seems clear that Dain is the heir (his name is even made of the same letters as the first king, Adin), but just then he gets kidnapped. Lief picks up his fallen dagger and carries it with him. Knowing that they must get the Belt to the true heir, the team makes plans to get into the city. However, their plans are all anticipated and most of the group is captured. It turns out Dain is not the heir, but a Grade 3 Ol, capable of assuming even inanimate shapes, and sent to spy on the Resistance and eventually on the trio. The fact that he had killed other Ols is not surprising; they were less talented varieties and the Shadow Lord's creations don't have anything resembling a conscience. Ols think only of furthering their own usefulness to the Shadow Lord. The fact that he was an Ol was the reason he was weakened when he entered the magical city of Tora, as its magic weakens evil. In the end, it is the Belt of Deltora itself that destroys Dain.

See also

Deltora series
Deltora Quest 1
Characters in the Deltora series
Emily Rodda

External links
Deltora Homepage: Scholastic USA
Deltora Homepage: Scholastic Australia
The Emily Rodda Website

2002 Australian novels
2002 fantasy novels
Australian children's novels
Australian fantasy novels
Children's fantasy novels
Deltora
2002 children's books